"Jessie's Girl" is a song written and performed by Australian singer Rick Springfield. It was released on the album Working Class Dog, which was released in February 1981. The song is about unrequited love and centers on a young man in love with his best friend's girlfriend.

Upon its release in the United States in 1981, "Jessie's Girl" was slow to break out. It debuted on Billboards Hot 100 chart on 28 March but took 19 weeks to hit No. 1 reaching that position on 1 August, one of the slowest climbs to No. 1 at that time. It remained in that position for two weeks and would be Springfield's only first-place hit. The song was at No. 1 when MTV launched on 1 August 1981. The song ultimately spent 32 weeks on the chart. Billboard ranked it as No. 5 for all of 1981.

The song also peaked at No. 1 in Springfield's native Australia and later won him a Grammy Award for Best Male Rock Vocal Performance.

"Jessie's Girl" was released in the United Kingdom in March 1984 and peaked at No. 43 on the UK Singles Chart in April 1984.

Record World said that "a strong rhythm guitar fuels the pop-rocker while Rick's determined vocal works the hook."

Springfield recorded an acoustic version of the song for his 1999 album, Karma.

Background
Springfield was taking a stained glass class. Also in the class were a friend of his named Gary and Gary's girlfriend. Springfield initially wanted to use the actual name of his friend, but instead decided to go with a different name. He chose "Jessie" because he was wearing a T-shirt with the name of football player Ron Jessie on it.

Springfield says that he does not remember the name of the girlfriend, and he believes that the real woman who inspired the song has no idea that she was "Jessie's Girl." He told Oprah Winfrey, "I was never really introduced to her. It was always just, like, panting from afar." Springfield told Songfacts that Oprah's people tried to find her, and they got as far back as finding out that the teacher of the class had died two years previously and that his class records were thrown out one year after his death. In 2006, the song was named No. 20 on VH1's "100 Greatest Songs of the 80s".

Chart performance

Weekly charts

Year-end charts

All-time charts

Certifications

Coheed and Cambria sequel
On 21 August 2020, the American rock band Coheed and Cambria released a music video entitled "Jessie's Girl 2" to their official YouTube channel. The video depicts Springfield, who supplies some of the song's vocals, working in a bar while the titular "Jessie's Girl" wreaks havoc. The lyrics state that the protagonist from the original song was successful in stealing the Girl away from Jessie, but realizes that she is mentally unstable. The protagonist muses that he was likely set up by Jessie, in order for him to be rid of the woman, and that he (the protagonist) is now trapped in a loveless marriage with children and a future he did not want. The video ends with the Girl stealing the barkeeper's keys and escaping. The song also references Tommy Tutone's "867-5309/Jenny" via lyrics that mention the protagonist changing his number.

The band's frontman, Claudio Sanchez, stated that the song is "kind of like a National Lampoon’s movie meets So I Married an Axe Murderer." Sanchez had originally come up with the idea of a sequel during a 2019 studio session and later approached Springfield to pitch the idea via an Instagram Live session. Springfield liked the draft prepared by Coheed and Cambria and agreed to participate.

Coheed and Cambria released the single digitally and as a 7-inch single in September 2020.

In popular culture
In regards to the song's use in films such as Boogie Nights (1997), 13 Going on 30 (2004), and Suicide Squad (2016) over 20 years after its original release, Springfield said, "I'm thrilled by it. As a writer, all you can ask is that a song has legs. It has an appeal that keeps coming back."

"Jessie's Girl" was covered on Glee in the episode "Laryngitis" (2010). Finn Hudson (Cory Monteith) sings it to Rachel Berry (Lea Michele) to express his opinions about her relationship with her then-boyfriend, Jesse St. James (Jonathan Groff). This version was certified gold by the Australian Recording Industry Association in 2010.

See also
List of Billboard Hot 100 number-one singles of 1981
List of Cash Box Top 100 number-one singles of 1981
List of number-one singles in Australia during the 1980s

References

External links
Rick Springfield discusses "Jessie's Girl" - RetroRewind interview

1981 singles
1981 songs
Rick Springfield songs
Billboard Hot 100 number-one singles
Cashbox number-one singles
Grammy Award for Best Male Rock Vocal Performance
Number-one singles in Australia
RCA Records singles
Song recordings produced by Keith Olsen
Songs written by Rick Springfield